Regina is an opera in three acts by Albert Lortzing who also wrote the libretto. It was composed in 1848, the year of the revolutions in the German states and during Europe's "Springtime of the Peoples", but it was not premiered until 21 March 1899 when it was performed at the Berlin State Opera. It is a "" (liberation opera) and the first opera which takes place in a factory with workers who strike and chant freedom songs. The first production of the original opera was in 1998 at the Musiktheater im Revier in Gelsenkirchen.

Roles

Synopsis

Act 1 
In the beginning of the opera, workers are on strike and demand higher wages and general changes in the society. The foreman Richard, who is betrothed with Regina, the daughter of the factory owner, is able to appease the irate mood of the crowd. Another foreman, Stephan, who is also in love with Regina, joins a free corps that consists of political insurgents and occupies the factory. Moderate and radical workers face each other. A battle begins during which the factory is set on fire and Regina kidnapped.

Act 2 
In act 2, Stephan and Regina are in a remote cabin. Regina tries to convince her abductor to change his mind when suddenly a simple employee enters the cabin and is mocked by the soldiers. Stephan leaves together with Regina.

Act 3 
The two attain an ammunition dump Stephan intends to use as a hideout. Richard and his men, keen to liberate Regina, approach their hiding place and surround it whereupon Stephan threatens everyone to blow up the ammunition dump. Regina, however, shoots him before he is able to undertake the atrocity. The workers cheerfully chant paeans and songs of liberty. The opera closes with a patriotic song exalting the fight for a united and democratic Germany:

Reception 
Regina is a "Freiheitsoper" (opera of liberty) and the first opera which takes place in a factory with striking workers and protagonists chanting songs of liberty. Although written in 1848, it was not staged until 21 March 1899. Due to political reasons, Regina was edited heavily by Adolph L’Arronge. Whereas the choir sang "Hail to thee, liberty!" in Lortzing's version, for example, L'Arronge changed it to "Long live Blücher!". Later editions were also heavily manipulated in order to fit the respective zeitgeist and the régime in power. The first staging of the original opera occurred on 13 March 1998 at the Musiktheater im Revier Gelsenkirchen, directed by Peter Konwitschny.

Recordings 
 Regina. Choir and orchestra of the Berliner Rundfunk, Walter Schartner (cond.). 1951 (mono). Cantus Classics/Line Music 5.00825
 Regina. Münchner Rundfunkorchester, Ulf Schirmer (cond.). 2011. cpo 777 710-2

References 

Further reading
 : Lortzing. Leben und Werk des dichtenden, komponierenden und singenden Publikumslieblings, Familienvaters und komisch tragischen Spielopernweltmeisters aus Berlin. Steidl, Göttingen 2000, 
 Jürgen Lodemann: "Nun kommt der Freiheit großer Morgen. Lortzings einzigartige Arbeits- und Freiheits-Oper Regina von 1848."
 Jürgen Lodemann: "Endlich – Die deutsche Freiheits-Oper Regina." In: Lodemann: Oper – O reiner Unsinn. Albert Lortzing, Opernmacher. Edition WUZ 19, Freiberg a. N. 2005 (RTF; 23 kB)

External links 
 Synopsis (German)
 
 

German-language operas
Operas by Albert Lortzing
Operas
1848 operas